Bart Schenkeveld (born 28 August 1991) is a Dutch professional footballer who plays as a centre back for Greek Super League club Panathinaikos. Besides the Netherlands, he has played in Australia and Greece.

Early life
Schenkeveld was born and raised in Den Hoorn, South Holland, a village between the cities The Hague and Rotterdam in the Netherlands.

Club career

Youth career
At the age of five, Schenkeveld started his youth career at the local amateur club SV Den Hoorn. After one season, Schenkeveld joined the Feyenoord youth academy as right winger, but got quickly turned into a defender. Schenkeveld successfully went through the complete academy, but had a major injury setback at the age of 15. The youngster partially tore his cruciate ligament, which caused him to be out for five months. When he was about to make his comeback, he tore his cruciate ligament completely. In total, Schenkeveld had to recover for almost two years.

On 29 November 2008, Schenkeveld was able to make his comeback for Feyenoord U19 in the youth match against Sparta Rotterdam U19 (2–1). Feyenoord youth coach Jean-Paul van Gastel was impressed by Schenkeveld's comeback: "If you work this hard for one-and-a-half years and you come back like this, it's unbelievable. I was standing at the sideline with goosebumps."

Feyenoord (2009–2012)
On 29 November 2009, exactly one year after his comeback, Schenkeveld made his official debut for Feyenoord's first team in the Eredivisie away match against ADO Den Haag (0–2). Due to Giovanni van Bronckhorst's suspension, Schenkeveld played on the right back position, as Kelvin Leerdam switched to left back.

On 7 January 2010, Schenkeveld signed his first professional contract with the Rotterdam club. It was confirmed that he will stay in de Kuip until summer 2012, with an option for another season.

On 23 December 2011, Schenkeveld joined another Rotterdam based team Excelsior on a loan deal.

Heracles Almelo and PEC Zwolle (2012–2017)
Between 2012 and 2017, Schenkeveld played for Eredivisie clubs Heracles Almelo and Zwolle.

Melbourne City
In August 2017, A-League club Melbourne City announced it had signed Schenkeveld on a 2-year deal.
On 22 January 2019, Schenkeveld scored his first goal for the club in a stoppage time winner against the Western Sydney Wanderers FC. He departed Melbourne City in July 2019.

Panathinaikos
On 28 August 2019, Superleague Greece club Panathinaikos announced it had signed Schenkeveld on a two-year deal. Schenkeveld as soon as he found his feet in the 2019–20 season. He is regarded as the player of the season and is a kind of player the club have lacked for years.

On 13 November 2020, Schenkeveld signed a contract extension, until the summer of 2023.  On 18 May 2021, Bart Senkefeld underwent surgery to restore instability in his ankle and was out of action for 6 months. After his injury he played two games with  Panathinaikos B. After his return ro the first team he became again a starter defender and he slotted in seamlessly, forging a strong pairing in the heart of defence with Fran Vélez. They were a major reason why the Greens went six straight league games at Superleague play offs without conceding a single goal. On 11 May 2022 he scored a goal at the Derby of the eternal enemies against Olympiacos an Panathinaikos take a very important away win which helped him to return on European competition after five years.

On 16 December 2022, Schenkeveld signed a new contract, running until the summer of 2025.

International career

Youth teams
Schenkeveld made his international youth debut on 6 December 2005. Schenkeveld was the captain of the youngest Dutch representative team, the Netherlands U15, in the friendly home match against Ireland U15 (3–1). The youngster continued his international career in the Netherlands U16, but was forced to skip the U17 and U18 representative teams due to his major injury.

Netherlands U19
After his comeback, Schenkeveld restarted his international career on 20 August 2009, as he got selected for the Netherlands U19 by youth coach Wim van Zwam for the first time.

Career statistics

Club

Honours
Panathinaikos
Greek Cup: 2021–22

References

External links
 Voetbal International profile 
 

1991 births
Living people
People from Midden-Delfland
Association football central defenders
Dutch footballers
Netherlands youth international footballers
Eredivisie players
A-League Men players
Super League Greece players
Super League Greece 2 players
Feyenoord players
Excelsior Rotterdam players
Heracles Almelo players
PEC Zwolle players
Melbourne City FC players
Panathinaikos F.C. players
Panathinaikos F.C. B players
Dutch expatriate footballers
Expatriate soccer players in Australia
Expatriate footballers in Greece
Footballers from South Holland